Karen Gerda Hnatyshyn  (born 1935 in Winnipeg, Manitoba) is a former viceregal consort of Canada, who held the role from 1990 to 1995 during her husband Ray Hnatyshyn's term as Governor General of Canada.

She attended the University of Saskatchewan and graduated with a bachelor of science degree in dietetics and nutrition. After an internship at the Royal Victoria Hospital in Montreal, she worked as a hospital dietitian in Saskatoon and Ottawa. She married Hnatyshyn in January 1960. The couple had two sons, John Georg Hnatyshyn and Carl Andrew Nygaard Hnatyshyn.

As the spouse of a Governor General, she was also invested as a Companion of the Order of Canada upon Ray Hnatyshyn's swearing-in.

In 1993, she hosted the premiere of an educational video promoting the importance of a healthy diet for people living with HIV/AIDS.

She co-authored Rideau Hall: Canada's Living Heritage, a book about the history of Rideau Hall, in 1995, with the proceeds going to make purchases of art and furnishings for the official residence. She also worked with the Canadian Heritage Garden Foundation to develop a heritage garden in the grounds of Rideau Hall.

Gerda Hnatyshyn is currently president and chair of the Hnatyshyn Foundation, an arts granting organization.

References

1935 births
Canadian viceregal consorts
Canadian philanthropists
20th-century Canadian non-fiction writers
Companions of the Order of Canada
Living people
Dietitians
Canadian people of Danish descent
Writers from Winnipeg
Canadian women non-fiction writers
Canadian women philanthropists
20th-century Canadian women writers